"800 Pound Jesus" is a song recorded by American country music group Sawyer Brown.  It was released in January 2000 as the third single from the album Drive Me Wild.  The song reached number 40 on the Billboard Hot Country Singles & Tracks chart.  The song was written by Billy Maddox and Paul Thorn.

Content
The song is about a man who purchases a statue of Jesus. He attempts to commit suicide by hanging himself, but his attempt is thwarted by landing in the statue's arms. Co-writer Paul Thorn previously recorded the song on his 1997 album Hammer and Nail; when Sawyer Brown lead singer Mark Miller heard the song on that album, he contacted Thorn and asked for permission to record it.

History
In 2000, the song was nominated by the Christian Country Music Association for both Song of the Year and Video of the Year.

Critical reception
Billboard published a positive review of the song, which described both Mark Miller's lead vocals and the production as "on target". The review also called the song "quirky but extremely likable" and "an amusing little ditty with a deeper message".

Chart performance

References

2000 singles
1999 songs
Sawyer Brown songs
Curb Records singles
Songs about Jesus
Songs about suicide
Songs written by Paul Thorn